The 2021 season is Lion City Sailors' 26th consecutive season in the top flight of Singapore football and in the Singapore Premier League. The season covers from 13 March 2021 to 2 October 2021. Coming into their second year with owners, Sea Limited, Lion City Sailors are surely aiming for the top spot of the Singapore Premier League after making big signings such as Brazilian duo Jorge Fellipe and Diego Lopes in the pre-season. In just his 2nd match for the team, Jorge Fellipe was able to score a late equalisers to level the game against Albirex Niigata Singapore FC which ended 2-2. Meanwhile, fellow countryman Diego Lopes took 5 matches to finally score a goal in Singapore and did so in stunning fashion, smashing in 3 goals and 2 assists against Geylang International which ended with a 8–0 win.

Squad

Singapore Premier League

U21 squad

Coaching staff

Transfer

In 

Pre-season 

 Mid-season

Out 

Pre-season

Mid Season

Loan Return 
Pre-season

Note 1: Bill Mamadou & Putra Anugerah returned before extending their loan with GYL.

Loan Out 
Pre-season

Note 1: Zulqarnaen Suzliman and Hami Syahin were subsequently loaned to Young Lions FC.

Mid Season

Extension / Retained

Promoted

Contract offer 

 Note 1: Harrison Delbridge was offered a contract by LCS but choose to sign for  Incheon United.

 Note 2:  Red Star Belgrade accepted the Euro1.7m offer but Miloš Degenek rejected the move and choose to stay on.

Friendlies

Pre-season friendlies

In-season friendlies

Team statistics

Appearances and goals

Competitions

Overview

Singapore Premier League

See also 
 2011 Home United FC season
 2012 Home United FC season
 2013 Home United FC season
 2014 Home United FC season
 2015 Home United FC season
 2016 Home United FC season
 2017 Home United FC season
 2018 Home United FC season
 2019 Home United FC season
 2020 Lion City Sailors FC season

Notes

References 

Lion City Sailors FC seasons
Lion City Sailors F.C.